Milgroim. Journal for Art and Literature was a Yiddish cultural magazine that was published between 1922 and 1924 in Berlin by Rimon. At the same time, the Hebrew language magazine Rimon was published in a similar format. Milgroym and rimon means "pomegranate" in Yiddish and Hebrew, respectively.

History 

Milgroim was founded by Mark Wischnitzer and Rachel Wischnitzer. Co-editors of the first issue were David Bergelson and Der Nister. Franzisca Baruch and Ernst Böhm designed magazine covers for both editions. Six issues were published, after which the publication was discontinued. The table of contents of the magazine was in Yiddish and in English, each article had a short summary in English. The advertisements for books were written in Russian or Hebrew.

The topics presented were taken from European art history and contemporary art, so there were essays on Leonardo da Vinci, Paul Cézanne and Max Liebermann as well as on Islamic art. Philosophical contributions dealt with Laozi, the Buddha, Hippolyte Taine, Hasidic Judaism, and Oswald Spengler. Translated to Yiddish was Der tote Gabriel by Arthur Schnitzler, excerpts from Arno Holz's Phantasus and Hugo von Hofmannsthal's Ballad of Outer Lifeprinted. The magazine provided space for the Yiddish contemporary poets David Bergelson, Dovid Hofshteyn, Moyshe Kulbak, Leib Kvitko, Der Nister, and Joseph Opatoshu.

The magazine had no direction, it was a broad forum for different currents, so it had no programmatic appeal in the first issue. In the first edition of Milgroim, Dovid Hofshteyn, who had also emigrated from the Soviet Union, described his feeling of disorientation with the "Lied meiner Indifferenz", which was printed in the same edition with the expressionist text "The Complete Awakening". In the dispute about the direction of the magazine, der Nister and Bergelson withdrew after the first issue, while Rachel Wischnitzer propagated an art based on religion in the fourth issue.

Covers of the first and third issues featured El Lissitzky's paintings that he had copied from the murals of Cold Synagogue in Mogilev. Third issue also contained his article about that synagogue and a painting by Issachar Ber Ryback, with whom he together travelled to the shtetls in 1914. The article also contained a number of painting from the synagogue. Lissitzky wrote enthusiastically and emotionally describing elements of wall painting; here is his first impression of what he saw:

In addition to Milgroim, the Yiddish magazine Der Onheyb ("The Beginning"), edited by David Einhorn, Shemaryahu Gorelik and Max Weinreich, was founded in Berlin. Kalman Singman brought out a Yiddish Kunstring-Almanach to Berlin. The Yiddish Warsaw journal Albatros published a number in Berlin in 1923. In addition, the Yiddish-speaking organizations offered space to Poale Zion in Unzer Bavegung, the General Jewish Labour Bund in Dos Fraye Vort and the Association of Eastern Jews in Der Mizrekh Yid for feature sections and art contributions. From the centers of Yiddish culture in Eastern Europe, the supposed plan to establish a new center of Yiddish culture in Berlin was sharply criticized. In fact, the publishers and most of the Yiddish authors returned to the countries of their readers in Vilnius, Warsaw, Moscow, Kiev and Odessa in the 1920s, and the Berlin cultural magazines were discontinued.

Further reading 
 Delphine Bechtel: Milgroym, a Yiddish magazine of arts and letters, is founded in Berlin by Mark Wischnitzer, in: Sander L. Gilman, Jack Zipes (Hrsg.): Yale companion to Jewish writing and thought in German culture 1096 - 1996. New Haven : Yale Univ. Press, 1997, S. 420–426
 Naomi Brenner: Milgroym, Rimon and Interwar Jewish Bilingualism. In: Journal of Jewish Identities, Januar 2014, S. 23–48
 Naomi Feuchtwanger-Sarig: "Rimon-Milgroim" : historical evaluation of a cultural phenomenon.  In: Österreichische Zeitschrift für Volkskunde, Bd. 113 (2010), Heft 3/4 Ist das jüdisch?, S. 569–595
 Susanne Marten-Finnis, Heather Valencia: Sprachinseln : jiddische Publizistik in London, Wilna und Berlin 1880 - 1930.  Köln : Böhlau, 1999, S. 121–129
 Anne-Christin Saß: Vom Mizrekh-Yid zur Jüdischen Welt. Die Publikationsorgane des "Verbands der Ostjuden" als Dokumente ostjüdischen Selbstverständnisses im Berlin der Weimarer Republik, in: Eleonore Lappin, Michael Nage (Hrsg.): Deutsch-jüdische Presse und jüdische Geschichte. Bremen 2008, S. 273–290.
 Susanne Marten-Finnis, Igor Dukhan: Dream and Experiment. Time and Style in 1920s Berlin Émigré Magazines: Zhar-Ptitsa and Milgroym. East European Jewish Affairs 35, no. 2 (2005)

References 
The article is partly translated from a German Wikipedia article, for original see :de:Milgroim.

External links 
 Milgroim, digitized by the Leo Baeck Institute
 "Translation, Cosmopolitanism and the Resilience of Yiddish: Wischnitzer’s Milgroym as a Pathway Towards the Global Museum" by Susanne Marten-Finnis

Publications established in 1922
Yiddish-language literature
Yiddish culture